Kasaba Sangaon  Kolhapur district, Maharashtra is located close to bank of Dudhaganga river. Its known history goes back to 1627, during Shivaji Maharaja: famous Maratha warrier's, empire. This place is also known for cooperative movements and strong economy as it hosts around 20 financial institutes. The town's population was boosted by the Kalamwadi Hydroelectric project.

Geography
Kasaba Sangaon is a small town located south-East to Kolhapur city in Southwest Maharashtra at 16.34°N, 74.21. By road, Kasaba Sangaon is 28 km south of Kolhapur, The nearest cities and towns within Kolhapur are Ichalkaranji (20 km), Kagal (6 km), Hupari (10 km)

Climate
Climate is a blend of coastal and inland climate of Maharashtra. The temperature has a relatively narrow range between 12 °C to 35 °C. Summer comparatively cooler, but much more humid, compared to neighbouring inland cities. Maximum temperatures rarely exceed 38 °C and typically range between 33 and 35 °C. Overall weather is good for farming.

History
Kasaba Sangaon has strong history of freedom fighters during pre independence of India. 
Post independence these peoples have had established education society, cooperative institutions to uplift the litrecay rate and economical level in the town.
Kasaba Sangaon has great heritage of Jain Parshawnath temple which is around 1600 years old. This town celebrates many festivals of all religions and host biggest carnivals in the region. Mahalaxmi Yatra and ladlesaheb dargha Urs are social celebrations of this town.

Culture
Village is mix of Jain, Bramhin, Lingayat, Maratha, Matang, Mahar and Muslim communities’ folks living happily.

Places of interest
1. D.M High school
2. Sonyacha Maal
3. Five-Star MIDC
4. Jain Mandir
5. Shri Basveshwar Mandir
6. Shivbhavani Mandir
7. Shri Hanuman Mandir
8. Swami Vivekanad English Medium School
9. Datta mandir ( Dattaraki)
10.ladlesaheb dargha
11.Masjid
12.Renuka Mata Mandir.
13.Ambabai Mandir.
14.Ganesh Mandir.
15.Vitthal Mandir.
16.Ram Mandir.

Economy

Economy of the town strongly centred on agriculture. Around 70% of land is under cultivation. Sugarcane is major crop of the town. Dairy and Vegetation are constitute major share for there daily incomes as sugarcane revenue is annual basis. The village has strong economy due to its well-developed co-operative base. As most of institution are run on co-operative basis. Whether it is irrigation, finance, dairy or schools.
In past few Near by Kagal Five Star MIDC is developing. As MIDC's major land share is from Kasaba Sangaon town, so over the past few years’ employment rate is growing.

Transportation

Kasaba Sangaon is around 20 km from Kolhapur. State and private run buses are available for commutating from Kolhapur. Train, Road and Air connected Kolhapur.

Notable people
 Dr Shivram Bhoje

References
India Villages Kasaba Sangaon

Kasaba Sangaon on google map

Cities and towns in Kolhapur district
Kolhapur district